IRTA may refer to:

Irish Real Tennis Association
International Reciprocal Trade Association
International Road Racing Teams Association
IRTA Cup, motorcycling event
Irta, a village in southwestern Estonia
Short for "I read that as".